Matthew James Osman (born 29 July 1983) is an Australian former professional footballer who played as a midfielder.

Club career
On 12 October 2007, Osman was injured during training and as a result he sat out the remainder of the 2007–08 A-League season. He was forced to have an anterior cruciate ligament reconstruction, returning to training in May 2008.
In July 2008 he re-signed with the Mariners for the 2008–09 season.

On 3 December 2008, Osman was signed by Gold Coast United for their inaugural A-league season. He signed for Parramatta Eagles in summer of 2011.

International career
Osman was named in the Australia under-20 team squad for the 2002 OFC U-20 Championship in Fiji.

Honours
Central Coast Mariners
 A-League Premiership: 2007–08
 A-League Pre-Season Challenge Cup: 2005

See also
List of Central Coast Mariners FC players
List of Gold Coast United FC players

References

External links
 
 Oz Football profile

1983 births
Living people
Sportsmen from New South Wales
Australian soccer players
Association football midfielders
Australia under-20 international soccer players
A-League Men players
National Soccer League (Australia) players
Central Coast Mariners FC players
Gold Coast United FC players
Northern Spirit FC players
Soccer players from Sydney